Cassissuchus is an extinct genus of gobiosuchid crocodyliform known from the Early Cretaceous Calizas de La Huérgina Formation in Spain. It contains a single species, Cassissuchus sanziuami.

References 

Crocodylomorphs
Fossil taxa described in 2017